"Judas Rising" is a song by heavy metal band Judas Priest. It is the opening track on the band's 2005 album Angel of Retribution. The song is about the Judas Priest Messiah on the cover of the albums Sad Wings of Destiny, Painkiller and Angel of Retribution.. It was also included on the album's The Essential Judas Priest and A Touch of Evil: Live. According to former guitarist K.K. Downing the origins of the song existed already in the 80's but were first finished for the Angel of Retribution album.

According to Rob Halford:

It was well received by fans, and has been regularly played live since the album's release.

Personnel
Rob Halford: Vocals
K. K. Downing: Guitars
Glenn Tipton: Guitars
Ian Hill: Bass Guitar
Scott Travis: Drums

References

2005 songs
Judas Priest songs
Songs written by Rob Halford
Songs written by Glenn Tipton
Songs written by K. K. Downing